The Temple Zion and School are located in Appleton, Wisconsin. According to a plaque outside the building, Houdini's father, Rabbi Mayer Samuel Weiss, helped plan the temple, which was "built with the financial support of many in Appleton regardless of their religion or background." Author Edna Ferber worshipped there.

In 1978, the temple and school were added to the National Register of Historic Places.

References

Synagogues in Wisconsin
Schools in Outagamie County, Wisconsin
Buildings and structures in Appleton, Wisconsin
Stick-Eastlake architecture in the United States
Defunct schools in Wisconsin
National Register of Historic Places in Outagamie County, Wisconsin
Synagogues on the National Register of Historic Places in Wisconsin